Orup 2 is the second studio album by Swedish singer-songwriter Orup, released in April 1989, by WEA.

Track listing

Charts

References

External links 

 

1989 albums
Orup albums
Warner Music Group albums